"Like a Pen" is a song by Swedish electronic music duo The Knife from their third studio album, Silent Shout (2006). It was released as the album's fourth and final single on 16 October 2006 in the United Kingdom and on 28 November in the United States.

Track listings
Swedish CD maxi single
 "Like a Pen" (Radio Edit) – 3:33
 "Like a Pen" (Album Version) – 6:15
 "Like a Pen" (Club Mix) – 8:18
 "Like a Pen" (Demo Version) – 5:28
 "Like a Pen" (Heartthrob Remix) -6:29
 "Like a Pen" (Thomas Schumacher Dub) – 8:15
 "Like a Pen" (Heartthrob Dub) – 5:19
 	 
UK CD maxi single
 "Like a Pen" (Radio Edit) – 3:24
 "Like a Pen" (Extended Club Mix) -8:18
 "Like a Pen" (Heartthrob Remix) – 6:29
 "Like a Pen" (Heartthrob Dub) – 5:19
 "Like a Pen" (Thomas Schumacher Dub) – 8:15

Charts

References

2006 singles
2006 songs
The Knife songs
Songs written by Karin Dreijer
Songs written by Olof Dreijer
Mute Records singles
V2 Records singles
Animated music videos